Ohi Day or Oxi Day is celebrated throughout Greece, Cyprus and the Greek communities around the world on 28 October each year. Ohi  Day commemorates the rejection by Greek prime minister Ioannis Metaxas of the ultimatum made by Italian dictator Benito Mussolini on 28 October 1940 and the subsequent Hellenic counterattack against the invading Italian forces at the mountains of Pindus during the Greco-Italian War and Greek Resistance during the Axis occupation.

Ultimatum
This ultimatum, which was presented to Metaxas by the Italian ambassador to Greece, Emanuele Grazzi, shortly after 03:00 am on 28 October 1940, who had just come from a party in the Italian embassy in Athens, demanded Greece allow Axis forces to enter Greek territory and occupy certain unspecified "strategic locations" or otherwise face war. It was allegedly answered with a single laconic word: όχι (No!).  However, his actual reply was, “Alors, c’est la guerre!” (Then it is war!).

In response to Metaxas' refusal, Italian troops stationed in Albania, then an Italian protectorate, attacked the Greek border at 05:30 am—the beginning of Greece's participation in World War II (see Greco-Italian War and the Battle of Greece).

On the morning of 28 October, the Greek population took to the streets, irrespective of political affiliation, shouting 'ohi'. From 1942, it was celebrated as Ohi Day, first mostly among the members of the resistance and after the war by all the Greeks.

Anniversary
During the war, 28 October was commemorated yearly in Greece and Cyprus, as well as by Greek communities around the world. After World War II, it became a public holiday in Greece and Cyprus. The events of 1940 are commemorated every year with military and student parades and on every anniversary, most public buildings and residences are decorated with national flags. Schools and all places of work are closed.

In popular culture 
 Kontserto gia polyvola (1967)
 Ohi (1969)
 The Battle of Crete (1970)
 October 28th, Time 5:30 (1975)
 Lieutenant Natasha (1970)
 Oi gennaioi tou Vorra (1970)
 The Mediterranean in Flames (1970)
 Submarine Papanikolis (1971)
 The title track from Sabaton's Coat of Arms is about Ohi Day
 Greek-American Comedian Yannis Pappas & His Mr. Panos "Oxi Day" Routine (2010)

See also
 Axis occupation of Greece
 Battle of Greece
 Greco-Italian War

References

History of modern Greece
Greek culture
Cypriot culture
October observances